The Gran Paradiso or Grand Paradis is a mountain in the Graian Alps in Italy, located between the Aosta Valley and Piedmont regions. It is located in Gran Paradiso National Park.

Geography 
The peak is the 7th highest mountain in the Graian Alps, with an elevation of 4,061 m. In the SOIUSA (International Standardized Mountain Subdivision of the Alps) the mountain belongs to an alpine subsection called "North-Eastern Graian Alps"  (It:Alpi del Gran Paradiso; Fr:Alpes du Grand-Paradis) and also gives its name to the gruppo del Gran Paradiso.

While the Mont Blanc massif straddles the border between France and Italy, the Gran Paradiso is the only mountain whose summit reaches over 4,000 metres that is entirely within Italian territory.

Routes 
Climbs normally start from either the Refuge Frédéric Chabod or the Refuge Victor-Emmanuel II. The latter is named after Victor Emmanuel II of Italy who created the Gran Paradiso royal reserve in 1856, presently the site of the Gran Paradiso National Park.

It is widely accepted that Gran Paradiso is one of the easiest four-thousanders to summit. This is not fully true, however, because while almost the entire route to the ridge is graded at F+, the last several dozen metres to the Virgin Mary (or Madonna) summit (ou  - 4058 m) comprises rock climbing with considerable exposure, with difficulties of grade I UIAA, while access to the proper main summit (4061 m) requires 15 minutes of climbing up to grade II UIAA. Gran Paradiso is popular with novice alpinists and many of these only climb to the Madonna summit.

In addition to the main summit routes, Gran Paradiso possesses a steep snow/ice North West Face, which can be climbed at AD+ from the Refuge Frédéric Chabod.

Nature conservation
Gran Paradiso is located in the Gran Paradiso National Park, an Italian national park named after the mountain. On the French side of the border, the park is continued by the Vanoise National Park.

See also

List of 4000 metre peaks of the Alps

References

Maps
 Italian official cartography (Istituto Geografico Militare - IGM); on-line version: www.pcn.minambiente.it
 I.G.C. (Istituto Geografico Centrale) - Carta dei sentieri e dei rifugi  1:50.000 scale n.3 Parco Nazionale del Gran Paradiso and 1:25.000 n.101 Gran Paradiso, La Grivola, Cogne

External links
 Ebyte.it, Gran Paradiso massif, a panorama with the names of all peaks

Alpine four-thousanders
Mountains of Aosta Valley
Mountains of Piedmont
Mountains of the Graian Alps
Four-thousanders of Italy